Graben Horn is a prominent horn or cone-shaped peak,  high, rising at the east side of Humboldt Graben in Antarctica. The peak is situated in the central part of the Pieck Range in the Petermann Ranges of Queen Maud Land. It was discovered by the Third German Antarctic Expedition under Ritscher, 1938–39, who named it in association with Humboldt Graben. "Graben", of German origin, is a term applied to a rift valley or a fault trough.

References

Mountains of Queen Maud Land
Princess Astrid Coast